Andrew James Matfin Bell (born 14 March 1986) is an English actor and dancer. He rose to prominence for his debut role in Billy Elliot (2000), for which he won the BAFTA Award for Best Actor in a Leading Role, becoming one of the youngest winners of the award. He is also known for his leading roles as Tintin in The Adventures of Tintin (2011) and as Ben Grimm / Thing in Fantastic Four (2015). Other notable performances include in the films King Kong (2005), Jumper (2008), Snowpiercer (2013), and Rocketman (2019). He earned a second BAFTA Award nomination for his leading performance in Film Stars Don't Die in Liverpool (2017). In television, Bell starred as Abraham Woodhull in the AMC historical drama series Turn: Washington's Spies (2014–2017).

Early life
Jamie Bell was born on 14 March 1986 in Billingham, Teesside, England, where he grew up with his mother, Eileen Matfin, and elder sister, Kathryn. His father, John Bell, a toolmaker, left before Jamie was born. Bell began his involvement with dance after he accompanied his sister to her ballet lessons.

Acting career 
In 1999, Bell was chosen from a field of over 2,000 boys for the role of Billy Elliot, an 11-year-old boy who dismays his working-class widowed father and elder brother by taking up ballet. Bell's performance received widespread acclaim, and 14-year-old Bell won London Film Critics' Circle Award for British Newcomer of the Year, British Independent Film Award for Best Newcomer, Evening Standard British Film Award for Most Promising Newcomer, and BAFTA Award for Best Actor in a Leading Role, becoming one of the youngest winners of the awards. He also appeared in Close and True, an ITV legal drama shown in 2000, which starred Robson Green, James Bolam, Kerry Ann Christiansen and Susan Jameson.

Bell served as Honorary Jury President of the 2001 Giffoni Film Festival. In 2002, he appeared as the disabled servant Smike in an adaptation of Nicholas Nickleby and a young soldier in Deathwatch. In the following years, he portrayed a teenager on the run in Undertow, a gun-toting pacifist in Dear Wendy, a disaffected Southern California teenager in The Chumscrubber, and the young Jimmy in the 2005 film version of King Kong. Also in 2005, he starred opposite Evan Rachel Wood in the Green Day video "Wake Me Up When September Ends", directed by Samuel Bayer. In 2007, he played the title character in Hallam Foe – for which he was nominated for the best actor award at the British Independent Film Awards – and appeared as himself in lonelygirl15 spin-off KateModern. He had roles in two 2008 films: the sci-fi film Jumper and the World War II drama Defiance. In the second film he plays Asael Bielski, the third of the Bielski Brothers, leaders of a partisan group that saved 1,200 lives during the Holocaust.

In 2009, producers announced that Bell would play the title role in the motion capture film The Adventures of Tintin, alongside Andy Serkis and Daniel Craig. The film was released in 2011. He also starred in the 2011 films The Eagle as Esca and Jane Eyre as St John Rivers. In 2013, he starred alongside James McAvoy in the film Filth and appeared as Edgar in Snowpiercer.

From 2014 to 2017, Bell appeared as Abraham Woodhull in Turn: Washington's Spies. In 2015, he played the Thing in the Fantastic Four reboot. The film would go on in infamy as one of the worst comic book films ever made. In 2022, Bell would say of it, "I don’t think [it deserves a second look.] Save your money, save your time."

In 2017, Bell had starring roles in 6 Days and Film Stars Don't Die in Liverpool. In 2019, he had a supporting role as Bernie Taupin in the biographical musical film based on the life of Elton John, Rocketman.

Personal life
Bell dated American actress Evan Rachel Wood for a year in 2005 after they had met at the Sundance Film Festival. Wood was aware of the false claims that they had first met while co-starring in the music video for Green Day's song "Wake Me Up When September Ends" and has stated they were "already dating and very much in love by that point." Five years later, in mid-2011, it was reported that Bell and Wood had rekindled their relationship. The couple married in a small ceremony on 30 October 2012. They have one son, born in July 2013. The couple announced that they had separated on 28 May 2014. As of March 2023, Wood and Bell are in dispute over the custody of their son. Bell said he was deprived of contact with him when Wood moved from Los Angeles to Nashville; Wood claimed she did this to protect the child from former fiancé Marilyn Manson. Bell argued in court that Wood's "story defies credibility", and accused her of "withholding our son from me for other reasons of her own invention."

In late 2015, Bell began dating his Fantastic Four co-star Kate Mara, and in January 2017 the couple became engaged. On 17 July 2017, they announced that they had married. They have a daughter, born in May 2019. On November 17th, 2022, his wife Mara announced on Instagram account that she had given birth to a son the week before.

Bell is an atheist.

He is also a keen football fan and an avid supporter of Arsenal F.C.

Filmography

Film

Television

Video games

Music videos

Accolades

See also
 List of British actors

References

External links 

People in Film: Jamie Bell – Focus Features

1986 births
Living people
21st-century English male actors
Actors from County Durham
Best Actor BAFTA Award winners
English atheists
English expatriates in the United States
English male ballet dancers
English male child actors
English male dancers
English male film actors
English male television actors
English male video game actors
English male voice actors
Male motion capture actors
People educated at Northfield School
People from Billingham